Thirunallur is a village in the Kumbakonam taluk of Thanjavur district, Tamil Nadu, India.

Demographics 

According to the 2001 census, Thirunallur had a total population of 1042 with 520 males and 522 females. The sex ratio was 1.004. The literacy rate was 65.72

Thirunallur is home to the famous Arulmigu Panchavarneswarar Alayam, a temple of Lord Shiva. A lingam in the temple changes color five times a day, turning copper-coloured, light red (the color of sunrise), the colour of molten gold, emerald green, and an indescribable colour.  Researchers have been unable to find the reason for the color changes.

References 

 

Villages in Thanjavur district